NBAA may refer to:

National Billiard Association of America, today the Billiard Congress of America
National Board of Accountants and Auditors, a government agency in Tanzania
National Business Aviation Association, a trade association in the United States